Kaarle Edvard "Kalle" Mikkolainen (9 January 1883 – 28 March 1928) was a Finnish gymnast who won bronze in the 1908 Summer Olympics.

He was a board member of Tampereen Pyrintö in 1909–1910.

He fought for the Red Guard in the Finnish Civil War and was a prisoner of war at the Tampere camp.

Olympic silver medalist Reijo Mikkolainen is his great-grandson.

Sources

References

1883 births
1928 deaths
Finnish male artistic gymnasts
Gymnasts at the 1908 Summer Olympics
Olympic gymnasts of Finland
Olympic bronze medalists for Finland
Olympic medalists in gymnastics

Medalists at the 1908 Summer Olympics
20th-century Finnish people